Giulio Cesare Borea (1621–1655) was a Roman Catholic prelate who served as Bishop of Comacchio (1649–1655).

Biography
Giulio Cesare Borea was born in 1621 in Lugo, Spain.
On 28 June 1649, he was appointed during the papacy of Pope Innocent X as Bishop of Comacchio.
On 11 July 1649, he was consecrated bishop by Marcantonio Franciotti, Cardinal-Priest of Santa Maria della Pace, with Luca Torreggiani, Archbishop of Ravenna, and Giambattista Spínola (seniore), Archbishop of Acerenza e Matera, serving as co-consecrators. 
He served as Bishop of Comacchio until his death on 11 March 1655.

While bishop, he was the principal co-consecrator of Benedetto Odescalchi (later Pope Innocent XI), Bishop of Novara.

References

External links and additional sources
 (for Chronology of Bishops) 
 (for Chronology of Bishops) 

17th-century Italian Roman Catholic bishops
Bishops appointed by Pope Innocent X
1621 births
1655 deaths